Stephen Philip Cohen (1936 – October 27, 2019) was an American political scientist and professor of security studies.  He was a prominent expert on India, Pakistan and South Asian security, He was a senior fellow in foreign policy studies at the Brookings Institution and an emeritus professor at the University of Illinois at Urbana-Champaign. He authored, co-authored or edited at least 12 books, and named as one of America's 500 most influential people in foreign affairs, and was a fixture on radio and television talk shows.

Education
B.A., M.A., University of Chicago
Ph.D., University of Wisconsin-Madison

Selected bibliography

See also 
The Idea of Pakistan

References

External links
 Brookings Institution profile
 
 A complete review of Stephen P. Cohen on an Indian website

University of Wisconsin–Madison alumni
American political scientists
Historians of Pakistan
University of Chicago alumni
University of Illinois Urbana-Champaign faculty
1936 births
2019 deaths
American scholars of Pakistan studies
Indologists
Writers about Pakistan
Brookings Institution people